The 1912 Indiana Hoosiers football team was an American football team that represented Indiana University Bloomington during the 1912 college football season. In their eighth season under head coach James M. Sheldon, the Hoosiers compiled a 2–5 record, finished in last place in the Western Conference, and were outscored by their opponents by a combined total of 100 to 80.

Schedule

References

Indiana
Indiana Hoosiers football seasons
Indiana Hoosiers football